The 1987 Central American and Caribbean Championships in Athletics were held at the Estadio Olímpico in Caracas, Venezuela between 24–26 July.

Medal summary

Men's events

Women's events

Medal table

See also
1987 in athletics (track and field)

External links
Men Results – GBR Athletics
Women Results – GBR Athletics

Central American and Caribbean Championships in Athletics
Central American and Caribbean Championships
Sport in Caracas
Athletics
International athletics competitions hosted by Venezuela